Yunnan Agricultural University (云南农业大学) is in Kunming, Yunnan, China.

History 
It was initially established in Kunming in 1938 as the 'School of Agricultural' at Yunnan University. Separated from Yunnan University in 1958, the School of Agriculture was renamed 'Kunming Agriculture and Forestry College' (KAFC). The formal title, Yunnan Agricultural University, was adopted in 1971 because of the merger between KAFC and Yunnan Agriculture Working University (YAWU). It has been developed as a key university of Yunnan Province since 1993.

In 2001, YAU became one of the two biological science experts training bases in Yunnan Province. YAU is now a comprehensive university offering programs in agriculture, science, arts, engineering, education, and administration.

Schools 
Yunnan Agricultural University consists of 15 schools.

School of Agriculture and Biotechnology
School of Animal Science and Technology
School of Economics and Trade
School of Engineering
School of Tobacco Science
School of Plant Protection
School of Ornamental and Horticulture
School of Resources and Environment
School of Water Resources, Hydraulics, and Architecture 
School of Science and Information
School of Food Science and Technology
School of Physical Education
School of Foreign Languages
School of Humanities and Social Science
School of Continuing Education

Programs 
There are 28 Bachelor's degree programs, 13 Associate bachelor's degree programs, and 18 Master's degree programs. 8 subjects are key subjects in Yunnan Province. YAU has two key laboratories and 23 research institutes/centers affiliated to the university. The key laboratories are the Key Phytopathology Laboratory of Yunnan Province and the Key Animal Nutrition and Feed Laboratory of Yunnan Province. The Biodiversity and Crop Disease Control Laboratory, which is the key laboratory of the Ministry of Education in China, is under planning. With the financial support of 10,400,000 RMB from Yunnan Province, the Key Laboratory of the Inbreeding Coefficient Study in Xishuangbana Mini-ear Swine is under the construction.

The university enrolls students from foreign countries. YAU has cooperated with domestic and foreign universities to enroll, co-advise doctoral students, and offer doctoral degrees.

Campus 
The university campus, covering an area of 130 hectares, is in Heilongtan Park (Black Dragon Pool Park), one of the scenic spots to the north of Kunming. The area of the campus building is about 250,000 square meters. YAU provides facilities for teaching and research projects.

The university library has 630,000 volumes and many other journals. The campus has been networked to improve its teaching and working effectiveness and efficiency. In 1998, YAU was awarded as a Civilized University by Yunnan Provincial Government.

Staff 
There are 1,198 faculty and staff members at YAU, of whom 51 are professors and 162 are associate professors. 113 faculty members are master's degree advisors, and 6 professors are appointed as the doctoral degree advisors by other universities. 11 outstanding faculty members have been selected as the major academic leaders in the New Century Science and Technology Projects in Yunnan Province. 10 faculty members have been awarded the outstanding science experts by Yunnan Province. 21 teachers have been honored as outstanding teachers in the province.

Students 
There are 6,831 students at present, including 5,315 undergraduate students, 171 graduate students, and 1,209 adult students undertaking their continuing education at the university.

About 40,000 students have graduated from the university. Many alumni have become specialists in the fields of science, education, agricultural production and administration.

Notable people
Li Zhengyou, professor, the "father of high-altitude hybrid rice".

References 
 https://web.archive.org/web/20080620023348/http://www.ynau.edu.cn:80/en/gaikuang/index.htm

External links 
 https://web.archive.org/web/20080609074754/http://www.ynau.edu.cn:80/

Universities and colleges in Kunming
Educational institutions established in 1938
1938 establishments in China